Gentryville is an unincorporated community in Douglas County, Missouri, United States. It is located approximately twenty-one miles southeast of Ava and twenty-two miles south of Mountain Grove at the intersection of Route 14 and Route 95. It consists of a small general store, an automotive repair shop, and a few churches. Gentryville cemetery and church are located about one-quarter mile north on Route 95.

Gentryville is located on a narrow ridge at  elevation between Fox and Brush creeks, both tributaries to Bryant Creek, which is a major tributary to the North Fork River.

References

Unincorporated communities in Douglas County, Missouri
Unincorporated communities in Missouri